Kuni Mulgi Deta Ka Mulgi (is a Marathi comedy film produced by Maa Mahalaxmi Entertainment and directed by Ashok Karlekar, Starring Ashutosh Kulkarni, Sheetal Maulik, its music is by Abhijit Pohankar. The production marks the first time in the Marathi Film Industry that Rekha Bhardwaj sings a Marathi song. Songs are choreographed by award-winning choreographer Phulwa Khamkar, written by Da Sachin Sharma

Cast

Ashutosh Kulkarni as Madan
 Sheetal Maulik as Mohini
Jaywant Patekar as Patil
Megha Ghadge as Laavni Dancer

Plot

The movie depicts a village called "Virpur", which has not seen even a single male getting married for the past 25 years. The males have got very eager for their marriage, as they had crossed the suitable age.

One fine day, Madan Mohan, son of the village head, returns from Mumbai after completing his education. Villagers seeks hopes in him as the person who could get married. The unmarried men of this village engages oneself to help in wedding preparation, with hopes that later they could even marry.

The story further describes about the strange villagers and their strange and weird thoughts of their ignorance and the resulting humorous situations, and of Madan’s true love.

References

External links 
https://www.facebook.com/KMDKMfilm
http://www.marathishowbiz.com/koni-mulgi-deta-ka-mulgi.php
http://www.gomolo.in/Movie/Movie.aspx?mid=42465

2000s Marathi-language films